This is a list containing the episodes of the French animated television series, The Jungle Bunch.

Series overview

Episodes

Season 1 (2013–14) 

 - Professor Ernest, a kiwi and the genius inventor of the Jungle, comes to the Jungle Bunch because an earth tremor has opened up a large crack right in the middle of his village! He needs the Jungle Bunch to repair it : they go deep inside the crack and, with the help of Ernest and Patrick succeed in "repairing" the village.
 The Boulder of Fear - The elephants is craignent by a so-called a ghost of the rock . Hidden behind the rock, the ghost asks them to give him all their fruits as an offering. The Jungle Bunch will soon discover that the ghost is really just a chameleon.
 Rubies Are Forever - Gilbert's former girlfriend, Melina, the evil Empress tyran of the Jungle, has taken the rubies of the jungle to create a laser which she will use to take destroy of the jungle and Jungle Bunch' lair.
 The Bloody Berry - A beautiful red fruit causes a galápagos tortoise to go into a deep sleep that's impossible to wake from. Meanwhile, Batricia also discovers the fruit to use as lipstick.
 The Invasion Has Begun - The flamingos think horseshoe crabs are aliens  who are invading their village. Maurice is the only one who can bring peace.
 Mission Keep Calm - The Jungle Bunch are called by the peaceful sea otters to save their village ransacked by Brito and the hamsters. But there is one condition: do not use violence.
 Captain Cahouete - But who is this marmoset pretending to be as brave as the Jungle Bunch and challenging the Grand Furax? Maurice il est preoccupe
 The Sand of Fire - Maurice's stripes are wearing away and needs more paint, but the painter doesn't have any more.
 The Great Evil Itch - Mama Dongo, an old meerkat and the Chamán of the Jungle, calls the Jungle Bunch to the rescue to find out about an itch that is driving the meerkats in zombies.
 Princess Groundhog - Lola, a baby groundhog refuses to sleep, so the Jungle Bunch has to tell her a story.
 The Striking Cry - The Jungle Bunch find themselves trapped in a cage overlooking an island surrounded by hyenas and crocodiles... Fortunately, Maurice is the master of The Striking Cry.
 Boiling Show - Fred the warthog recruits some singers and is taken to the Rock of the lynxes. However, the lynxes want to get rid of him so they can become the only singers of the jungle.
 Free Fall - Join Maurice the penguin who thinks he's a tiger and his misfit friends as they embark on an adventure they will never forget!
 The Great Treasure Quest Part 1 - The Jungle cave is brutally attacked by a horde of evil raccoon pirates: Grubby Beard and his gang are searching for Suzy, they want to retrieve the treasure map of his father's the Old Jim ... The Jungle Bunch go with Suzy in search of the treasure.
 The Great Treasure Quest Part 2 - The Jungle Bunch heads off on an exciting pirate-style adventure.
 The Great Treasure Quest Part 3 - The Jungle Bunch go on a pirate adventure.
 The Great Treasure Quest Part 4 - Pirates.
 The Little Plant of Horrors - Marla, a crazy aye-aye botanist, can't control the carnivorous plant she has created and it doesn't stop growing! The Jungle Bunch are sent in to destroy it.
 The Devastation - Vladimir and a termite clan have taken possession of the jungle, they destroy the trees and this causes a chain reaction.
 The Jungle Bunch and the Lost Groove - Fred has lost his groove and only Pelvis, The King of the Rock, can help him find it. The only problem is that Pelvis is mostly king of the playback.
 The Swamp - A toucan family have lost their egg at the bottom of the swamp and the Jungle Bunch are sent to recover the egg before it hatches.
 The Five Taos of Thunder - Maurice's Kung Fu master, Hector the echidna, comes to the Jungle Bunch because Koro and his henchmen the mandrills and the monkeys want to steal the Five Taos of Thunder.
 Flight Over a Lettuce Nest -It's been a few weeks since lettuce started disappearing at the turtles' nursing home. Karapas seeks the Jungle Bunch's help and after an investigation they discover the robber is an old friend of Karapas.
 Daddy Miguel - When a hummingbird egg hatches right in front of the Jungle Bunch cave, Miguel becomes the hatchling's father.
 Seven minutes Flat - Ernest devises a system to boil water inside the volcano and when things get out of control the Jungle Bunch have seven minutes to keep the volcano from destroying the jungle!
 An Impossible Mission - When the signal is triggered while all of the Jungle Bunch falls ill, Al and Bob are the only two who can take on the mission, but turns Ferdinand tricks them into stealing the mandrill's statue.
 The Night Monster - A beaver family seeks the Jungle Bunch's help because the home keeps getting destroyed by a giant tyrannical demon.
 Possum Recall - An opossum rings the signal of the Jungle Bunch, but he can not remember who he is.
 The Valley of the Hundred Perils - No one has ever reached the end of the Valley of Hundred Perils. The Jungle Bunch will however have to go there to find two lovers who ran away.
 Dragon Mission - A mysterious dragon has hypnotized a vulture, and a komodo dragon who broke into the naked mole rats's underground city and stole a treasure.
 The Prophecy - Mama Dongo's village gives all of their food as offerings to the gods to avoid the end of the world and now it seems the prophecy will come true!
 Smoked Bananas -A cockatoo comes inside of the Jungle Bunch lair and imitates their voice giving orders or contradictory instructions to each other. That creates a huge mess. Meanwhile, a fire starts in the jungle The Jungle Bunch go to the rescue, but with the cockatoo, it's not easy.
 Junior's First Catch - Junior wants to show Maurice all he has learned in becoming a great warrior and tiger by grabbing his first prey alone (a hungry crocodile).
 Assault on the Jungle Bunch - An evil black rhinoceros named Fat Tony has launched a hunt throughout the Jungle, he is after the monster who had stolen his fruits on his trees. All the animals are very scared and take refuge in the Jungle Cave. The Jungle Bunch protect the animals and the little jerboa who took the fruits without knowing it was not allowed.
 In Her Majesty Service - Gilbert's family is held hostage by the King of the koalas. The King wants to offer the Jungle Bunch as a birthday present to his spoiled daughter who will consider them as her toys.
 The Fan Club - Captain Cahouete, Melina, The Hyenas, Brito and the hamsters, Vladimir, And Grand Furax Former opponents pose as members of a fan club.
 The Jungle Bunch's Nightmare - An jerboa named Mickey poisons the Jungle Bunch with a plant that can make you have nightmares.
 Jungle Bells - Parents seek help when their kids won't listen to them.
 The Strongest Animal in the Jungle - Miguel is tricked into a tournament competing for the title of Strongest Animal of the Jungle.
 Desperately Seeking Bob - The Jungle Bunch must track down Bob after he and Al have a conflict. They better find Bob soon because he finds himself in a sticky situation!
 Saving Al and Bob! - Al and Bob have been kidnapped! The Jungle Bunch go to save them, but there are many traps along the way.
 Jungle Eyes - A peacock hypnotizes a clan of jerboas to paint the jungle fuchsia!
 The Cyclone Eye - Gilbert is the only one to anticipate the arrival of a huge Cyclone, and Gilbert is hurt, annoyed because nobody takes him seriously. A thunderstorm of hailstones bursts out, Maurice and the Jungle Bunch leave warning the other animals of the jungle and putting them under cover. But while they think of having saved everybody, a small groundhog comes to see them because we forgot her grandfather. The Jungle Bunch look for him, in the cyclone, and discover that his old grandfather is really very bad-tempered.
 Shells and Shellfish - The Jungle Bunch are on Vacation.
 Web of Fear - A gothic female armadillo named Audrey, and Bibi, her little pet spider, need help. All the spiders of the jungle are gone. Gilbert is afraid of the ecological loss of balance, so, the Jungle Bunch goes search the spiders. They find that it's Vladimir, the vampire opossum, who “diverts” them to spin a giant web. He also makes Salvador paint his giant portrait on it.
 Trippleped Strikes Back! - The Jungle Bunch go on holiday to try to rest. But this mission of relaxation turns out to be more complicated than planned as all the animals around the beach ask them to solve their problems.
 The Yellow Cave Mystery - The Queen Esmeralda's crown has been stolen! Without it she will not be considered queen anymore. The Jungle Bunch go out to investigate this mystery.
 Jungle Bunch Tackles a Wedding - A box turtle named Marcel comes to see the Jungle Bunch: He is about to get married, but during a bachelor party which took place before the marriage, he met a band of Rowdy mandrill rugby players who employed him as a "ball". As a result, he is now very far from his future wife and risks to miss his marriage.
 The Fireflies Night - Batricia's cousins want to bring Batricia back to her village for the fireflies Party. She follows them with Gilbert, who wants to see the sparkling fireflies, a very rare species.
 Hic Hic Hiccups! - A gerbil needs help because she hasn't been able to get rid of her hiccup. No problem, Maurice and his friends just have to frighten her but even the Valley of Fear and its terrible legend doesn't scare the gerbil.
 The Stars Stone - A koala named Roger, is looking for the Jungle Bunch: five reptiles invaded his garden. Dhoom, a cobra, and his gang are observing a big stone in the middle of Roger's garden. The Jungle Bunch and Patrick, the axolotl who's visiting his friends, go to the garden. Dhoom is venerating the star stone which is actually a meteorite made of metal. Gilbert knows that. He is afraid of the coming storm, as this could make the stone electric.
 The Jungle Bunch Behind The Wheel - It's the mandrills vs. the koalas in a car race, with the loser leaving the jungle.
 Funny Bird (Crossover with the series The Owl & Co) -The Jungle Bunch goes about their day-to-day lives around their pond, when two characters appear: a caterpillar, followed by its regular predator, An Owl. The owl, as unmoved as indestructible, quickly irritates the Jungle Bunch who tries to get rid of it by all means necessary!

The Jungle Bunch: To The Rescue Season 2 (2015–2016) 
This season was released in France on November 2, 2015.
Episodes
 (54) The Cube - The Jungle Bunch prevents the other animals from taking a blue cube, but in the end, it turned out to be a copy of Al's Sculptures.
 (55) Show Must Go On - Fred is kidnapped by Pelvis.
 (56) The Melting Mangoes - Salvador comes to The Jungle Bunch, very upset because someone stole his most beautiful painting called "The Melting Mangoes".
 (57) Dance of the Vultures - A raccoon named Nestor Ivan comes asking the Jungle Bunch for help because every night, raccoons mysteriously disappear from the village he lives in. They discover what is causing the disappearances, a vulture named Conde Nosferapace who is kidnapping the raccoons to use as servants for his annual ball called "The Dance of the Vultures". He spots Batricia and kidnaps her to be his future wife. Now it is up to Maurice and the boys to rescue her from Nosferapace.
 (58) The Mini Jungle Bunch - Six little baby animals Lolo, Tooko, Freddy, Louie, and Al and Bob's nephews play as if they were the Jungle Bunch. When they see that the Jungle Bunch is getting ready for a new mission, they decide to follow them from afar.
 (59) Bad Hamsters - When the Jungle Bunch are tricked by Brito and the hamsters, it is up to Al and Bob to gain back control of the Jungle Cave from the furry menaces.
 (60) The Tiger Hunt - A cockatoo tells Maurice and Junior they are invited to a Tiger's convention but it turns out to be a trick by Captain Couette, the Great Furax, Melina, Vladimir, Doom, and Fuse.
 (61) Abracadabra - Two bats come to ask for help from the Jungle Bunch because a mandrill magician evicted from their cave who finds that their cave is the ideal place to settle down and perform magic tricks.
 (62) Pursuing the Green Emerald Paw Paw - Marla comes to the Jungle Bunch because the moment has come for the delicious green pawpaw to bloom; that happens only once every 100 years, but mandrills know about it and they are going to try to eat it.
 (63) All Bets Are Off - Some otters are running a possibly crooked casino.
 (64) Catch as Catch Can - Lola's family are asking Jungle Bunch for help because their daughter Lola ran away to participate in a wrestling competition. The Jungle Bunch go to the competition, where Junior is also participating.
 (65) Mammoths Rule! - A mole named Lucy has come to The Jungle Bunch for help because her boyfriend Emile has been captured by a group of Mammoths. The Jungle Bunch think that this is unlikely because mammoths have been extinct for thousands of years.
 (66) A Secret Mole - Every night, watermelons are stolen by a mole. Could this 's criminal acts have good intentions?
 (67) For a Fistful of Cahouetes - Some robbers steal the jungle's supply of cactus juice.
 (68) The Wild Bunch - The Jungle Bunch help some marmots whose village has been invaded by Johnny the Barbarian and his army of rabbits.
 (69) Jungle Bums - The Jungle Bunch discovers that they have doubles who, though they look alike but don't act like them because they are doing villainous acts to all of the jungle animals.
 (70) Planet of the Ape - A beaver named Bruno comes to The Jungle Bunch for help because Koro and the Apes raided his home and captured his family and friends. Now the apes capture The Jungle Bunch and convince Miguel to join them.
 (71) Tarsier in Danger - Gilbert is kidnapped by some lynxes who are part of Melina's Plan to eliminate The Jungle Bunch
 (72) Guava or Pawpaw - Alfredo the possum is upset about his meerkat neighbors.
 (73) The Jungle Feast - A competitor named Chucky (famous for his Chucky burger) will do whatever it takes to win a cooking competition—even kidnapping Bob to distract his fellow competitor, Al.
 (74) Ice Scream - Ernest has built a machine to collect ice cream from the mountain which is causing avalanches which is scaring the animals.
 (75) An Explosive Duel - An epic battle of scientists ensues at the Jungle Cave when Melina tries to plunder Gilbert's lab.
 (76) 20,000 Bubbles Under the Sea - Ernest went into the sea and hasn't come back, so Gilbert uses an improvised submarine and searches for the missing kiwi with Junior.
 (77) The Jungle Genius Awards - Gilbert and Ernest enter the Jungle Genius competition but their invention is stolen by Vladimir.
 (78) This Land is Not Your Land - The Jungle Bunch must teach self-confidence to a village of timid jerboas who are being bullied by the King of the Koalas and his henchmen.
 (79) Rabbit trickeries - The tortoise egg Princess Sissy has been kidnapped by Shenzi, Banzai, and Ed and the tricky rabbit Archibald, who pretends to help the Jungle Bunch to retrieve the egg to the turtle queen from surrendering her crown to a snapping turtle before it's too late.
 (80) The Good, The Baddies and The Intern - Miguel is mistakenly kidnapped for Gilbert by El Po-po, an Intern(a rabbit) and a group of evil animals who forced him to make a giant robot to destroy to the Jungle and to the Jungle Bunch, but in the end the giant robot collapses and the Intern decides to join Miguel.
 (81) Brain Drain - Maurice is bitten by a spider and can't remember who he is.
 (82) Caset Their Nests - A dangerous mosquito escapes from Gilbert's study forcing the Jungle Bunch to try to prevent an epidemic.
 (83) Marcel the Puppet Master - A village of cuddly koalas(they were in control of sticky licky butter) hypnotizes the Jungle Bunch and makes them collect the ingredients for the butter.
 (84) Hibertarsus - Gilbert thaws his prehistoric ancestor from a block of ice but needs to find the prehistoric female mate too.
 (85) A Sticky Situation - Roger the gardener has Mr Stanley stuck to his back and it's up to the Jungle Bunch to free them apart.
 (86) Saving Junior - The Jungle Bunch need to come up with a rescue plan before Junior is catapulted into space.
 (87) SOS Meteorite - Ernest has inadvertently knocked an approaching meteorite into a collision course with the jungle.
 (88) Furies on the Prowl - A gang of baddies steal the water of the desert and it's up to The JUngle Bunch to stop them.
 (89) For a Few Pearls More - Junior is invited to beach where he meets some friends the oysters were in control by Vladimir.
 (90) The Christmas Heist - The Jungle Bunch has to organize a heist in order to regain a bag of letters made by children for the Presents Feast.
 (91) The Fake Fan - Mickey is a fake fan of the jungle bunch so he tricked Victor the Aye Aye about their weaknesses.
 (92) Eggs Hunt - Salvador has just lost five eggs he was supposed to paint for the birds. The eggs are now scattered throughout the jungle and will soon hatch.
 (93) Inseparable Duo - Al and Bob tell how they became friends.
 (94) Beware of the Gorilla - Miguel helps in a game of soccer to defend the family's Stuffed Banana stand from an evil group of Mandrills.
 (95) Double Frog Dare - Al & Bob and Al's old friend an Armadillo are tricked by Big Tony into fetching a bouquet of flowers for his Fiancée.
 (96) A Fishbowl for Two - A piranha tricks The Jungle Bunch into stealing Junior's new submarine is taken in a plot to steal the pink flamingos' Sapphire Egg.
 (97) Mini Jungle Bunch, Maxi Fear - Junior and two young friends take an unexpected ride in a hot air balloon.
 (98) Jungle Giggles - The Jungle Bunch come up against the hyena's laughing gas in the heist of the century.
 (99) Phantoms - The Jungle Bunch are trapped in a cave and require the assistance of ghosts to escape.
 (100) Invaders from the Deep - The Jungle Bunch must protect the tallest, the biggest and the oldest from the people of the deep(Octopuses).
 (101) Surpriiise! - Vladimir and the loyal Igor have taken three beaver Uncles as their prisoners.
 (102) The Jungle Bunch Are in the Place - Gilbert & Miguel attend a banquet after a game of 'Yes Yes No No' but are interrupted by bandits.
 (103) Crescendo Megalo - Vladimir and the faithful Igor have taken a musical genius as their prisoner.
 (104) Patator - Gilbert unwittingly unleashes an army of potato robots who threaten to enslave everyone including a caracal into growing potatoes.
 (105) The New Hero - Gilbert must rescue three kidnapped youngsters and prove that he is not just a brain but a hero that thinks.
 (106) Operation Chouettage De Dragon (Crossover with the series The Owl & Co) - Maurice gets hit in the head by a tree branch and starts thinking that the residents of the forest are the Jungle Bunch.

The Jungle Bunch: To The Rescue Season 3 (2018–2019)
 (107) Stop or My Mum Will Scratch - The hippos are angry with the kiwis and are threatening to destroy their village! Can the Jungle Bunch help them resolve their differences before things get out of hand?
 (108) The Scoundrel Museum - Vladimir has kidnapped all the bees in the jungle, and he's using them to build a wax museum to celebrate his greatness! Can the Jungle Bunch find a way to stop him?
 (109) Sweet Tooth - The jerboas are trapped on their island as a giant saltwater crocodile is stopping them from going in the water. Can the Jungle Bunch find a way to free them?
 (110) Lethal Banana - All the bananas in the jungle are going missing! Goliath and Miguel team up to investigate in this action-packed mission!
 (112) Tough Luck! - Pollux is suffering from a very strange disease - he's the most unlucky creature in the jungle, and his bad luck seems to be contagious! Can the Jungle Bunch help him become lucky?
 (113) Meet the Tarsiers - Al gets all puffed up, and it's going to take a great botanist to find a cure and get his proper shape back! Gilbert goes in search of his father, Gildas, to see if he can help.
 (114) The Minis at the Looney Well - The Mini Jungle Bunch fall into the Loony Well. Down there, they try to free the princess of the realm, kept prisoner by Totor.
 (115) The Dogs in the Reservoir - The kiwis ask the Jungle Bunch for help when a gang of hyenas start stealing their food.
 (116) The Jungled - Victor, the Jungle Bunch's biggest fan, asks the Great Warrior Tiger about their very first adventure. Maurice tells him the full story of how the team met.
 (117) From Dusk 'Till Yawn - Will Al and Bob be able to overcome their love for insects and not eat a single one for an entire day? Batricia bets that they won't be able to, but the bet has some unexpected consequences.
 (118) Invasion of the Carrot Snatchers - The rabbits' territory is surrounded by explosive mushrooms and carnivorous plants after Marla and Roger mix up some seeds! Can the Jungle Bunch save the day?
 (119) My Son, My Hero - Maurice decides to go on a mission all by himself to prove to his mother that he is a grown-up and can manage without her constantly protecting him.
 (120) Melina's Independence Day - Melina returns with an evil plan to become empress of the jungle! The Jungle Bunch must act quickly if they are to stop her...
 (121) Last Cave on the Left - Junior and Lola discover that a bunch of moles are stealing Lola's grandfather's fruits!
 (122) Once Upon a Time, in the Jungle - Al and Bob fall into the trap of a crocodile who plans to have them as a meal! Can they escape in time?
 (123) Mums Are Off-Limits - It's Mother's Day and the Jungle Bunch are busy preparing their gifts. But their mums have been hypnotised by the snake Dhoom and forced to destroy all the mammal villages!
 (124) Irresistible - While picking up different flowers for a gift for Batricia, Gilbert finds himself covered with very powerful pheromones
 (125) The Fifth Magnet - Closely followed by a group of invasive fans led by Victor, the Jungle Bunch are facing a giant magnet that created Ernest, the wacky inventor.
 (126) The Clash of the Herbal Teas - Natacha takes Junior to a village led by grandmas, where they are forced to take part in chamomile tea and knitting workshops.
 (127) Princess Monochromed - Under the threat of princess Capriciella, Salvador is forced to paint her portrait.
 (128) The Slider Surfer - Goliath is sad - he doesn't feel young anymore. To cheer him up, Junior takes him to spend a little time with his friends.
 (129) A Clock for Orange - Maurice and Roger have an hour to make an antidote to the toxic painting that covers their body!
 (130) 21 Jungle Street - After mysterious robberies at school, Maurice puts his schoolbag on and decides to infiltrate the place.
 (131) 12 Cold Monkeys - The monkeys' village is plagued by an epidemic of cold. As Ernest is convinced that his brand new time machine will save the day, the Jungle Bunch go for searching an antidote.
 (132) Holy Gravy - Merlinou the wizard comes to meet Bob.
 (133) The Bush Brothers - Fred is sad - he's lost track of his old band members. The Jungle Bunch decides to surprise him and try to find the musicians.
 (134) Bad Luck Ernest - During a 'guess who' game, the Jungle Bunch think back to all of the crazy inventions created by Ernest the Kiwi.
 (135) Flight of the Flamingos - Gilbert and Batricia's families meet for the first time, but nothing goes as planned!
 (136) Tiger and Grumpy - Maurice and Junior go to Natacha's place for a holiday.
 (137) Special Convoy - Gilbert has accidentally created a bomb capable of destroying the jungle! Can the gang get rid of the dangerous weapon before it's too late?
 (138) Who Framed Ronald the Elephant? - Ronald the elephant arrives in a panic - he is being pursued by a group of mandrills who plan to kidnap the king!
 (139) Neverending Party - Miguel is asked to be the guest of honour at "Groundhog Day".
 (140) Not So Amusant Park - Junior and Miguel spend the afternoon at Mickey the jerboa's amusement park. He says he has changed and he wants to make up for his past misdeeds - but is he being genuine?
 (141) The Gorilla and the Queen - Miguel accidentally finds himself guardian of the 'cup ceremony' - an event that could prevent war between two rival hamster villages. Can he hold things together and restore peace?
 (142) Coaching Tiger, Hidden Giraffe - Part 1 - Part 1 of 3: A symbol of ying and yang appears in the sky. This is a sign that Pong To, the greatest kung fu master of the jungle, is back to face the heir of his former disciple, Natacha, in a fight to the death...
 (143) Coaching Tiger, Hidden Giraffe - Part 2 - Part 2 of 3: Maurice remembers his training with kung fu master Hector. He there learned the greatest lesson of all: humility. There is still a chance to defeat Pong To, which lies at the bottom of the Well of Truth...
 (144) Coaching Tiger, Hidden Giraffe - Part 3 - Part 3 of 3: At the edge of the volcano where Pong To is waiting, no-one can resist the Master's power. Nobody, except Junior. Is it is actually him that Pong To came to face?
 (145) Kitchen With a Plot - After a popular restaurant is destroyed by a falling tree, the Jungle Bunch offer to step in - but running a restaurant turns out to be a lot harder than they thought it would be!
 (146) Nutter Island - Maurice and El Popo are stranded on a desert island! Can they find a way to escape?
 (147) Benny's Misfortunes - 
 (149) Les Mini as a Foudlart -
 (150) Jungle Daylight -
 (151) Rise of the Saltwater -
 (152) Jungle Academy -
 (153) Thump, Miguel Thump! -
 (154) The Champions to the Rescue -
 (155) She, Fugitive -
 (156) Fab and Furious -
 (157) The Jungle Blob -
 (158) Pirates of the Cahouetes -
 (159) V for Veteran -
 (160) Catch My Cake if You Can -

Films Series (2011-2023)
 The Jungle Bunch: Back to The Ice Floe (2011)
 The Jungle Bunch 2: The Great Treasure Quest (The Great Treasure Quest Part 1-4) (2014)
 The Jungle Bunch (2017)
 The Jungle Bunch Sequel (2023)

References

Lists of French animated television series episodes